Shape of My Heart may refer to:

 "Shape of My Heart" (Sting song), a 1993 song by Sting from the album Ten Summoner's Tales
"Shape of My Heart" (Backstreet Boys song), a 2000 song by the Backstreet Boys
 "Shape of My Heart" (Noah and the Whale song), 2008 song by Noah and the Whale, charting 94 in the UK
Shape of My Heart, a 2009 album by Katia Labèque
"Shape of My Heart", a 2012 single by Rick Price from The Water's Edge
The Shape of My Heart, the UK title of God-Shaped Hole, a 2003 novel by Tiffanie DeBartolo